Badminton has been a European Games sport since the inaugural edition.

Editions

Events

Medal table

Participating nations

References
2015 European Games at BWF Tournaments
2019 European Games at BWF Tournaments

External links
Badminton Europe homepage

 
European Games